The Viso Mozzo  is a 3,019 metres high mountain on the Italian side of the Cottian Alps.

Toponymy 

In Italian viso means face, but in this context refers to the Monviso, which is very close to the Viso Mozzo, and  mozzo means cut off. Thus the whole name should mean Cut-off Monviso; an old local name of the mountain is Viso-Mout.

Geography 
Viso Mozzo is located in the upper Valle Po and stands east-north-est of Monviso, from which is divided by the colle dei Viso (Viso Pass). Its western side, facing Monviso, is a long and almost uniform rock-field, while the other faces of the mountain are more irregular.

SOIUSA classification 
According to SOIUSA (International Standardized Mountain Subdivision of the Alps) the mountain can be classified in the following way:
 main part = Western Alps
 major sector =  South Western Alps
 section = Cottian Alps
 subsection = Southern Cottian Alps	
 supergroup = 	Gruppo del Monviso i.s.a.
 group = Gruppo del Monviso p.d.
 subgroup = Nodo del Monte Viso
 code = I/A-4.I-C.8.a

Access to the summit 
The normal route to the Viso Mozzo runs across the west face of the mountain and does not requires . Starting from Pian del Re (known as the river Po source, 2,020 metres), one can follow the nr.V13 foothpath leading to the alpine hut Quintino Sella. At colle dei Viso, leaving the main foothpath and  turning left, following some cairns, in roughly one hour is possible to reach the mountain top, marked by a metallic summit cross and offering an interesting view both on the Monviso massif and on the Po plain.

Mountain huts 
 Rifugio Quintino Sella al Monviso (2,640 m).

References

Maps

 Istituto Geografico Militare (IGM) official maps of Italy, 1:25.000 and 1:100.000 scale, on-line version
 Sistema Informativo Territoriale della Provincia di Cuneo, based on a 1:10.000 scale numeric map of Regione Piemonte
 Istituto Geografico Centrale, Carta dei sentieri 1:50.000 scale nr. 6, Monviso, and 1:25.000 scale nr. 106, Monviso - Sampeyre - Bobbio Pellice

Mountains of the Alps
Alpine three-thousanders
Mountains of Piedmont
Three-thousanders of Italy